Ernest Foster Millward (1887 – 23 June 1962) was an English footballer. He played for Glossop, Wrexham, Stoke, Hanley Swifts, Port Vale, Huddersfield Town, and Crewe Alexandra; playing one game in the Football League for Huddersfield.

Career
Millward played for Glossop, Wrexham, Stoke and Hanley Swifts before joining Port Vale, probably in 1907. His first known game for the club was in a 4–2 home win over Hanley Town in a North Staffordshire Federation League Cup match on 25 January 1908; after one further appearance in the competition he departed, most likely at the end of the season.

He returned to nearby Stoke, who had left the Football League for the Birmingham & District League. He made his debut for the "Potters" in the 1908–09 season. He scored a hat-trick past Wellington Town in a 7–0 win on 10 October 1908, and finished the season with nine goals in 30 games. He was prolific in 1909–10, hitting 16 goals in 46 games, including the winner against Exeter City that won Stoke a place in the FA Cup First Round draw. Stoke topped the Southern Football League Division Two A table with ease, but failed to dominate the Birmingham & District League, and so were not re-elected into the Football League.

However Millward signed with Huddersfield Town, as they won election to the Football League for the first time in the club's history. He played just one Second Division game in 1910–11 campaign, before joining Crewe Alexandra.

Career statistics
Source:

Honours
Stoke
Southern Football League Division Two A: 1909–10

References

1887 births
1962 deaths
Footballers from Staffordshire
English footballers
Association football midfielders
Glossop North End A.F.C. players
Wrexham A.F.C. players
Port Vale F.C. players
Stoke City F.C. players
Huddersfield Town A.F.C. players
Crewe Alexandra F.C. players
English Football League players